Lise Bertelsen (born 8 September 1975) is a Danish politician currently serving as Member of the Folketing for the Conservative People's Party since the 2022 Danish general election.

Career 
Bertelsen was educated as a special education pedagogue. She was elected to the municipal council of Viborg Municipality at the 2021 Danish local elections. In 2022 Bertelsen was elected to the Folketing with 1,894 personal votes.

Personal life 
Bertelsen lives in Viborg, is married and has three children.

References 

Living people
People from Aarhus
Members of the Folketing 2022–2026
1975 births